Kacey Lee Musgraves (born August 21, 1988) is an American country singer. She has won six Grammy Awards, seven Country Music Association Awards, and three Academy of Country Music Awards. Musgraves self-released three solo albums and one as Texas Two Bits, before appearing on the fifth season of the USA Network's singing competition Nashville Star in 2007, where she placed seventh. Musgraves also released a Christmas-themed album, A Very Kacey Christmas, in 2016.

Her fourth studio album Golden Hour (2018) was released to widespread critical acclaim and won all four of its nominated Grammy Award categories, including Album of the Year and Best Country Album. The album's first two singles, "Space Cowboy" and "Butterflies", won the Grammy Award for Best Country Song and Best Country Solo Performance respectively. Musgraves' fifth studio album, Star-Crossed, was released in September 2021.

Early life 
Kacey Lee Musgraves was born August 21, 1988, in Golden, Texas, to Craig and Karen (née Abrams) Musgraves. Craig is the owner of a small printing business, M-Prints Printing, Inc., in Mineola, Texas, and Karen Musgraves is an artist. Musgraves has stated that she was born six weeks prematurely and weighed only five pounds. Musgraves has one younger sister, Kelly Christine Sutton (née Musgraves), who is a photographer.

Musgraves began songwriting at the age of eight, when she wrote a song called "Notice Me" for her elementary school graduation. She first learned to play music on the mandolin, then at age 12 started taking guitar lessons from a local musician named John DeFoore, which she later described as "one of the most important things that ever happened to me."

Musgraves' mother took her to local music festivals to sing western swing music. Along with co-student Alina Tatum, she was part of children country music duo Texas Two Bits, which toured through Texas and released an independent album in 2000, and earned an invitation to perform at President George W. Bush's "Black Tie and Boots Inaugural Ball". At age 14, her family funded her first solo, self-released album. She graduated from Mineola High School in 2006, and moved to Austin, Texas, at the age of 18. In 2007, Musgraves competed on Season 5 of the singing competition reality TV series Nashville Star, where she placed seventh.

Career

2008–2014: Debut and beginnings 
Musgraves was discovered professionally in 2008 while living in Austin by producer Monte Robison for his independent record label, Triple Pop. She collaborated with the Josh Abbott Band in 2010 on the song "Oh, Tonight". Musgraves' two acoustic recordings for Triple Pop (covers of OneRepublic's "Apologize" and Miley Cyrus' "See You Again") are available on a digital EP released in 2012. "Apologize" (Acoustic Version) charted in the Billboard Hot Singles Chart at No. 23 on February 15, 2014, and racked up over 31,000,000 streams on Spotify. To commemorate the 10-year anniversary on March 30, 2018, Triple Pop released the "Acoustic Remixed" digital EP, which featured newly remixed and remastered versions of the same recordings.

Musgraves joined Lady A on the European leg of their Own the Night Tour in 2012. In 2012, she signed with Mercury Nashville and released her solo debut single "Merry Go 'Round". The song is included on her major-label debut album Same Trailer Different Park, produced and co-written by Musgraves, Shane McAnally and Luke Laird and released on March 19, 2013. The album debuted at number 2, selling 42,000 copies. It produced additional hit singles in "Blowin' Smoke" and "Follow Your Arrow". Rolling Stone magazine listed "Follow Your Arrow" at number 39 of its list of 100 Greatest Country Songs of All Time, and said that Musgraves was "one of the loudest symbols of young country musicians embracing progressive values."

"Undermine", a song co-written by Musgraves and Trent Dabbs, was featured in one of the first episodes in the first season of the television series Nashville on October 17, 2012. Musgraves co-wrote Miranda Lambert's 2013 single "Mama's Broken Heart" and sang harmony on the song.

Musgraves was nominated for four awards at the 47th Annual Academy of Country Music Awards in 2012, including Female Vocalist of the Year.

Musgraves was also nominated for four Grammy Awards at the 56th Annual Grammy Awards, tying Taylor Swift and Lorde for the most nominations received by a woman that year. Those nominations included Best New Artist, Best Country Album (Same Trailer Different Park), and Best Country Song for both "Mama's Broken Heart" and "Merry Go 'Round". "Merry Go 'Round" won the Best Country Song Grammy award, and Same Trailer Different Park won in Best Country Album.

Musgraves joined Katy Perry on the North American leg of her Prismatic World Tour as well as Willie Nelson and Alison Krauss on select dates during their tour. Musgraves provided backing vocals for "Bourbon in Kentucky", the lead single on Dierks Bentley's 2013 album Riser.

In April 2014, Musgraves won the Academy of Country Music award for album of the year for Same Trailer Different Park. In June 2014, she released a new song called The Trailer Song, which she debuted on The Tonight Show Starring Jimmy Fallon. Same Trailer Different Park was certified gold in August 2014 for selling over 500,000 copies. Musgraves' single "Follow Your Arrow" was also certified gold, and "Merry Go Round" was certified platinum.

2015–2017: Subsequent releases 

Musgraves announced in late August 2014 that she would perform a 10-show headlining tour, titled Same Tour Different Trailer, which started on September 25 and ended on October 19.

In September 2014, Musgraves said that she had begun writing songs for her second major label album, and planned to work with Luke Laird and Shane MacAnally later in the year after her touring schedule finished. "Biscuits", the lead single from the album, was released on March 16, 2015.

Pageant Material, Musgraves' second studio album, was released on June 23, 2015. To support the album, Musgraves performed on The Tonight Show Starring Jimmy Fallon (June 9, 2015), Late Night with Seth Meyers (June 10, 2015), Good Morning America (June 23, 2015), The View (June 24, 2015), Jimmy Kimmel Live! (September 14, 2015), The Late Show with Stephen Colbert (January 8, 2016), and The Late Late Show with James Corden (April 6, 2016).

Musgraves was featured on a remix of Miguel's single "Waves", released on February 26, 2016.

On September 7, 2016, Musgraves announced the release of her first Christmas album, A Very Kacey Christmas. The album, which features eight traditional and four original songs, was released on October 28, 2016, through Mercury Nashville. In support of the album, Musgraves embarked on a Christmas-themed tour, complete with a strings section, an accordion, a bass, a saxophone, a clarinet, and backup singers.

In September 2016, Musgraves was selected as one of 30 country music artists to perform on "Forever Country", a mash-up track of "Take Me Home, Country Roads", "On the Road Again", and "I Will Always Love You". The song celebrates 50 years of the CMA Awards and secured Musgraves her first number-one country single.

In 2017, Musgraves provided backing vocals on "All the Best", a John Prine cover, for Zac Brown Band's album Welcome Home. Also in 2017, Musgraves was featured on Outlaw: Celebrating the Music of Waylon Jennings. Originally recorded for TV, it later was released on CD and DVD. During the broadcast, Musgraves performed Jennings' song "The Wurlitzer Prize". Musgraves appeared on the June 21, 2017, episode of Hollywood Medium with Tyler Henry to receive a psychic reading and connect with her grandmother, Barbara Taylor, to learn more details about her death in a house fire. Musgraves has said that her song "This Town", from the album Pageant Material, is about her grandmother, and that her voice appears in the opening of the song.

2018–2020: Breakthrough 

In October 2017, Musgraves posted a picture of herself on Twitter indicating she was in the studio writing new songs for her upcoming third studio album. On December 12, 2017, Musgraves announced the title of her third studio album Golden Hour through Entertainment Weekly. The songs "Butterflies" and "Space Cowboy" were released as the first singles from the album on February 23, 2018. In March, Musgraves headlined the 2018 C2C: Country to Country festival in London after playing the festival in 2016.

Musgraves premiered "High Horse", the third song from the album, on March 22, 2018, on Zane Lowe's Beats 1 Apple Radio show. On March 29, 2018, she performed "Slow Burn" on The Late Show with Stephen Colbert. Golden Hour was released on March 30, 2018, on MCA Nashville. On May 12, 2018, Musgraves was the musical guest on Saturday Night Live, performing "High Horse" and "Slow Burn". Through June and July, Musgraves was the opening act on the second North American leg of Harry Styles: Live on Tour. In September, Musgraves appeared on a rerecorded version of "There's No Gettin' Over Me" with Ronnie Milsap for his 2019 duet album. On October 2, 2018, she appeared on Jimmy Kimmel Live! as the musical guest. In October 2018, Musgraves embarked on the "Oh, What a World Tour" in support of Golden Hour. The tour began in Oslo, Norway on October 13. In February 2019, Golden Hour won Album of the Year at the 61st Annual Grammy Awards. The same month, Musgraves released "Rainbow" as the fifth single from the album. In April, Musgraves featured on a newly recorded version of "Neon Moon" with Brooks and Dunn for their duet album Reboot. She also made a cameo appearance as herself in the country-music drama film Wild Rose, released in April. In May, Musgraves made her Met Gala debut as a Barbie doll and afterwards announced she had signed with modeling agency IMG. In August, Musgraves appeared at San Francisco's Outside Lands Music and Arts Festival, among her largest festival appearances to date. In October 2019, Musgraves revealed that she would cover the song "All Is Found" for Frozen II. The song plays over the end credits and is also included on the soundtrack album.

On November 4, 2019, Musgraves announced The Kacey Musgraves Christmas Show, a holiday special premiering through Amazon Amazon Prime Video on November 29. On November 20, 2019, she debuted the song "Glittery" featuring Troye Sivan on The Tonight Show Starring Jimmy Fallon. The soundtrack to the show includes collaborations with other artists, including a cover of "I'll Be Home for Christmas" together with singer Lana Del Rey. The show also stars Kacey's grandmother Barbara (Nana) Musgraves. In April 2020, she appeared in the Together at Home virtual concert series and performed "Rainbow". That same month, she released an Earth Day inspired remix of "Oh, What a World".

2020–present: Star-Crossed and other projects 

On May 29, 2020, Musgraves was featured on The Flaming Lips single "Flowers of Neptune 6" and also provided vocals on two additional tracks ("Watch the Lightbugs Glow" and "God and the Policeman") on their album American Head, which was released on September 11, 2020. Musgraves also provides backing vocals on several tracks on Ruston Kelly's second album Shape & Destroy, which was recorded before she and Kelly divorced. On December 10, 2020, Troye Sivan released a reworked version of his song "Easy" which features Musgraves and was produced by Mark Ronson. Musgraves' song "Oh, What A World" was used in the Paramount Network original Christmas movie Dashing in December. She voiced Earwig's mother in the English dub of the Studio Ghibli film, Earwig and the Witch.

In April 2021, Musgraves announced that her new album would be released later that year, in partnership with UMG Nashville and Interscope Records, her first release on the latter label. Golden Hour co-producers Daniel Tashian and Ian Fitchuk will return to work on the project. Musgraves began teasing her next album by releasing snippets of new music on her 33rd birthday. On August 23, Musgraves revealed that her fifth album, now titled Star-Crossed, would be released on September 10, along with an accompanying 50-minute film which will be available for streaming exclusively on Paramount+. Musgraves also released the album's title track.

In August 2021, Musgraves announced a 15-city star-crossed: unveiled tour for the album Star-Crossed. On October 2, Musgraves became the first ever musical guest to perform nude on Saturday Night Live.

Artistry

Influences 
Musgraves lists Alison Krauss as one of her career role models, stating, "I mean, how many Grammys does she have? She's just remained solid and true and great, and I respect that".

Musgraves' favorite artist is John Prine and, in a tribute performance to him following his death in 2020, she stated that "my favorite quality of John's would be his sense of humor and it really influenced my songwriting a lot" and proclaimed "that man singlehandedly influenced me and my songwriting more than anyone else on this planet". Musgraves also lists Lee Ann Womack as one of her childhood influences: "Lee Ann Womack is from near where I grew up in East Texas, so I've always looked up to her." Speaking of both Prine and Womack, Musgraves stated, "if I could sing it like Lee Ann would and say it like John would, then I feel like I've gotten somewhere".

Of her sophomore album, Musgraves listed albums by Glen Campbell, Bobbie Gentry, Marty Robbins, Charley Pride, Roger Miller, and Jim Croce as influences and an interview with Rolling Stone Country cited Ray Price, Julie Miller, and Loretta Lynn.

In a Billboard interview, Musgraves said that she is a Dolly Parton fan, saying "Beauty, sex appeal, brains, wit, humor, beautiful songwriting, meaningful songwriting, no apologies for who she is, LGBTQ advocate long before it was even a thing or trendy or whatever... She's fearless and I admire her spirit a lot and she's very kind. She's very present when you're talking to her and I just really love her so much."

Noncountry artists whom Musgraves has mentioned as influences include Cher, Selena, Ryan Adams, Cake, Neil Young, Weezer, Imogen Heap, Bee Gees, Sade, and Electric Light Orchestra.

Lyrical themes and style 
Musgraves is known for her progressive lyrics in the conservative country music genre. Her music has tackled controversial topics such as LGBT acceptance, safe sexual intercourse, recreational marijuana use, and questioning religious sentiment.

In an interview with the Wall Street Journal, Musgraves talked about criticism she faced for her rebellious lyrics. "I think throwing the rebel card out there is really cheap," she said. "The things I'm singing about are not controversial to me, I don't push buttons to push buttons. I talk about things that have made an impression on me that a lot of people everywhere are going through."

Personal life 
In 2014, in an interview with ABC Radio, Musgraves said she had been in a relationship with her bandmate Misa Arriaga for several years after becoming friends first.

Musgraves met Ruston Kelly at the Bluebird Café in Nashville. In May 2016, they had a songwriting date, and they began dating shortly after. Musgraves stated that the song "Butterflies" from her album Golden Hour is about her courtship with Kelly. On December 24, 2016, Musgraves became engaged to Kelly. They married on October 14, 2017, in Tennessee. The couple filed for divorce in July 2020, which was finalized in September 2020.

Kacey was seen hanging out with poet Cole Schafer in June of 2021 and the relationship was officially confirmed in a New York Times interview in August 2021.

Discography 

 Same Trailer Different Park (2013)
 Pageant Material (2015)
 A Very Kacey Christmas (2016)
 Golden Hour (2018)
 Star-Crossed (2021)

Tours 
Headlining
Same Trailer Different Tour 
The Kacey Musgraves Country & Western Rhinestone Revue 
A Very Kacey Christmas Tour 
Oh, What a World: Tour (2018–2019)
Oh, What a World: Tour II (2019)
Star-Crossed: Unveiled (2022)
Opening act
50th Anniversary Tour 
2012 Spring Tour 
Own the Night Tour 
Tornado Tour 
No Shoes Nation Tour 
Take Me Downtown Tour 
Together in Concert 
Prismatic World Tour 
Strait to Vegas 
The Breakers Tour 
Harry Styles: Live on Tour

Awards and honours

Academy of Country Music Awards 
The Academy of Country Music Awards is an annual country music awards show, the first ever created, established in 1966. Musgraves has won four times.

American Music Awards 
The American Music Awards is an annual major American music award show by the American Broadcasting Company, presented since 1973.

Americana Music Honors & Awards 
The Americana Music Honors & Awards were established by the Americana Music Association to celebrate the best releases in Americana music

Country Music Association Awards 
The Country Music Association Awards is an annual country music awards show, established in 1967. Musgraves has won seven awards.

CMT Music Awards 
The CMT Music Awards is an annual ceremony dedicated exclusively to honor country music videos. It was established in 1967.

Grammy Awards 
The Grammy Awards are presented annually by the National Academy of Recording Arts and Sciences for outstanding achievements in the music industry. It has been presented since 1958. Musgraves has been nominated eleven times and won six awards.

Other awards

References

External links 

 
 Interview with Kacey Musgraves on Ben Sorensen's REAL Country

 
1988 births
Living people
American acoustic guitarists
American country guitarists
American country singer-songwriters
American women guitarists
American women country singers
Country pop musicians
Grammy Award winners
Mercury Records artists
Singer-songwriters from Texas
Interscope Records artists
Nashville Star contestants
People from Wood County, Texas
American LGBT rights activists
Country musicians from Texas
21st-century American singers
Guitarists from Texas
People from Mineola, Texas
21st-century American women singers